Arsenic dioxide is an inorganic compound with the chemical formula As2O4, containing As(III) and As(V), AsIIIAsVO4.

Synthesis
It can be synthesized in an autoclave via the following reaction:
2  +  → 2

Structure
It adopts a layer structure, and the coordination geometry of As(III) is triangular pyramid while As(V) is tetrahedral.

References

Arsenic compounds
Oxides
Mixed_valence_compounds